Litoria kumae is a species of frog in the subfamily Pelodryadinae,  endemic to Papua New Guinea.
Its natural habitats are subtropical or tropical moist montane forests, freshwater marshes, intermittent freshwater marshes, rural gardens, heavily degraded former forests, ponds, and aquaculture ponds.

References

Ranoidea (genus)
Amphibians of Papua New Guinea
Amphibians described in 2004
Taxonomy articles created by Polbot